The Grand Slam Tokyo (formerly ) is an international judo competition held as part of the International Judo Federation (IJF) World Tour Grand Slam series.

Venues 
1978–2006: Nippon Budokan
2007–present: Tokyo Metropolitan Gymnasium

Past winners

Men

Women

External links 
All-Japan Judo Federation

Video links 
Grand Slam Tokyo 2013
Grand Slam Tokyo 2012
Grand Slam Tokyo 2011
Grand Slam Tokyo 2010
Grand Slam Tokyo 2009
Grand Slam Tokyo 2008

Tokyo
Judo competitions in Japan
Judo
Judo
Judo in Japan
Judo
Judo